Gonçalo Vasques de Moura (born-14th-century) was a Portuguese nobleman, Alcaide of Moura and Guard of Afonso IV of Portugal.

Biography 
Gonçalo was the son of Vasco Martins Serrão de Moura and Teresa Pires de Góis. His mother was daughter of Pedro Salvadores de Góis and Maria Nunes, belonging to illustrious Lusitanian families.

Gonçalo Vasques de Moura was married to Inês de Sequeira, daughter of Álvaro Gonçalves de Sequeira, Alcaide-mor of Lisboa, and Brites Fernandes de Cambra.

References 

14th-century Portuguese people
Medieval Portuguese nobility
Portuguese Roman Catholics